Streptomyces tirandamycinicus is a bacterium species from the genus of Streptomyces which has been isolated from a marine sponge from the coast of Wenchang.

See also 
 List of Streptomyces species

References 

tirandamycinicus
Bacteria described in 2019